Juilly is a commune in the Seine-et-Marne département in the Île-de-France region in north-central France. The composer and organist Raphaël Fumet (1898–1979) was born in Juilly

Demographics
Inhabitants are called Juliaciens.

See also
Communes of the Seine-et-Marne department
College of Juilly

References

External links

1999 Land Use, from IAURIF (Institute for Urban Planning and Development of the Paris-Île-de-France région) 

Communes of Seine-et-Marne